John Winkler may refer to:
 John E. Winkler (1941–2007), author and photographer
 John J. Winkler (1943–1990), American philologist and Benedictine monk